Umueze Anam is a village in Anam in the Anambra West Local Government Area of Anambra State, Nigeria.

History

Founding 
It is said that Umueze Anam was founded by one hunter from Amadioba Nteje known as Nwavor in the 17th century. He used to hunt for game around the Omambala River when he found a peaceful peninsula across the river and settled there. Nwavor was accused of having a hand in the death of a relative, and in other to free himself from the accusation decided to leave Nteje and settle at Odah. He first arrived at a place called Odah Anam where he found a lot of wildlife and fertile land for agricultural purposes. After settling for about a week he went back and brought his wife and brother Udora who was a farmer and fisherman to settle in the area. They were first to settle at Odah before other settlers like Mmiata, Oroma, Umuoba, Umuikwu and Iyiora to make up Anam in order of arrival. These initial settlers make up what is called Anam Nkpu Isaa (Seven nodes of Anam). Anam is a corrupt form of Anagba which means coming together of diverse people who have agreed to be united and leave in peace (Anam means Unity).

The people of Anam being republican in nature do not have monarchical leadership there was no king, they have parliamentary system where the elders in council presides over the affairs of the people with the head of the council being the eldest man in the land (diokpala). Determining who was the eldest man became difficult until a situation came up when there was no fire to light up the settlement, and since there was no means of knowing who is the oldest Man among them, they decided that whoever would be brave enough to fetch fire from the slave camp at Odene-Nneyi would be crowned the diokpala. Nobody took that bold step, but the Great Nwavor, who went and brought fire from the camp for his brothers to use, was then crowned Diokpala (Eze-Anam). When Nwavor and his descendants further moved down to Aboh area (Area currently called Aboegbu and Miata Anam) and settled there until the early 19th Century when other Anam community fled Odah as a result of invasion of the area by Aboh slave warriors, Umueze Anam took the bold step of returning to Odah to protect other Anam communities from further attacks.

Aboh Invasion 
During the Aboh invasion, the Anam people consulted a diviner who told them that they could only defeat the Aboh warriors with the aid of a charm that the diviner would prepare. He told them that the consequence of the charm is that the bearer of that charm must die and the charm will cause confusion when thrown into the Aboh Camp. Amah from Amekeme a great son of Umueze Anam from Ebendu clan volunteered to carry out the task. His brother Iwo of Odionwu clan from the same umuebendu volunteered to accompany his brother such that if he is killed he will ensure that the head of his brother returns home while Obalichi from Umuoba anam lead Anam warriors to the fight. Eventually, they succeeded and defeated Aboh warriors and killed Prince Enebeli of Aboh.

Ani Anam 
Anamites started stealing, killing and coveting people's wives. This was attributed to the infiltration of Anam by strangers, and prompted the elders of the town to make a covenant to put a stop to these evils. This again demanded a sacrifice; Odionwu, a descendant of Eze Nwavor, volunteered. The covenant is as follows:

That if you don't commit evil, evil will not befall you;
No Anam man shall kill his fellow Anam man;
No Anam man shall steal his brother's belongings;
No Anam man shall unlawfully sleep with his brother's wife;
No Anam man shall disobey his elders.

Umueze Anam, being the eldest man, was given custody of the symbol of authority of Ani Anam, while Agha was given the Abuke Anam deity, and Eze was given Ani Anam.

Oba Title-taking

Umueze Anam celebrates achievements as in other parts of Igboland. Apart from kingship, Oba title-taking is a culmination of one's achievement in Umueze Anam. Titles are awarded for:

 Gaining of a position of authority and honour in the town;
 Provision of funds for his maintenance in his old age;
 Entitlement to have a say in the town councils;
 Immunity from assault or arrest in his own or any other friendly town;
 Exemption from manual labour;
 Authority to wear certain special regalia and insignia;
 Certain privileges sometimes accorded to his wife;
 Asserting oneself as a freeborn of the community.

Process 
Ogbuevi (Oba) title-taking in Umueze Anam is a long process of three distinct segments, Ijoku, Asammuo, and Ime Oba, which are performed sequentially.
Before the title of Ogbuevi is conferred on anybody of Umueze lineage, the candidate is required to have successfully gone through the process of performing the special Oba Umueze ritual.
Oral tradition holds that the first citizen of Umueze Anam to take the Ogbuevi title was Ogbuevi Dielie Mezie of Iweze Ogboru Eze. He was followed by Ogbuevi Agbogu Nwabude of Ezum Iyile Eze.
Oba was the ceremony for the highest title in Anam. Before one will take the Oba title he is expected to perform the lesser titles such as Ijoku, Asamuo, and finally the Oba title.

Before the Nigerian Civil War, Christians (Catholics) were unable to take the Ozo title because the rituals were perceived to be against their faith. This problem was looked into by the Commission set up by the Archbishop of Onitsha, Francis A. Arinze (later a cardinal). A solution was found as expressed below as the official Archdiocesan position immediately after the war in 1970:

"That the religious ceremonies traditionally connected with title-taking are hereby recognized as non-essential to the title itself. Therefore, the titled man who takes the title without these ceremonies must be regarded as fully titled, and in no way inferior to his counterparts who performed the ceremonies together with pagan religious observances.

That everything connected with pagan religion which is in any way contrary to the Christian faith is hereby removed for all members, Christians or non-Christians, who want to be initiated into the title society. Therefore, there will be no consultation of fortune-tellers, no pagan sacrifices, no visitation of a pagan shrine, nor worship of the spirits or ancestors, no marks of office which are indissolubly bound up with pagan religion, etc.

That the members of the title society, both Christians and non-Christians, may attend the funeral rites of a deceased member, but the title society will not perform pagan religious ceremonies of any shape or form.

That all the formalities of title-taking, which are not against Christian beliefs and practices, may be preserved when Christians take titles. These include the payment of the stipulated sum or other goods, division of these things in the traditional way, feasting, dancing, etc. Sometimes, modification will be necessary. This applies, for example, to dress, dance, and some aspects of the outing function and widowhood ceremonies, if they offend against the Christian moral code.

That the titled Christian assumes all the purely social insignia of his office, such as ankle cords, red cap, eagle feather, elephant tusk, etc. He also acquires all the social rights and privileges which are accorded to titled men according to tradition."

1. Ijoku Title:-  Ijoku is the first to be taken, this qualifies him to answer the title name Uduezuo. Ijoku means the washing of the early morning hands. Which is to say that it was the first step leading to Oba title. This stage involves 300 tubers of yam (ji ommi) presented in October with 200 pieces of kolanut, tobacco, wine, money and a she goat (Ewu Ijoku).

2. Ekwu Title:- This is the second stage, it costs 209 tubers of yam, 500 kolanuts, wine, money a he goat (Nkpi ekwu), and smoked fishes (Ukpobu).

3. Asammuo Title:- This is the next in rank, it costs 290 tubers of yam, drinks, a pan of kolanuts, big she goat, ram and some money. The candidate after this stage is conferred with the title of Ogbuebunu.

4. Oba Title:- This is the final stage, Oba is the highest title in Anam, it is a big traditional ceremony that takes place before the conferment of the highest title of Ogbuevi to any Anam man. It involved a lot of merry making and for that reason a prospective initiate had to be well prepared before embarking on the Oba title. Oba involves 400 tubers of yam a cow or cash equivalent of the two items and presentation of ego nsunani Oba. 
Oba title is not for all comers in Anam, the candidate must be a good citizen and a free born, he must be an adult who must be able to keep to the rules pertaining to the title. One person could Take as many title as possible but must be conferred with one only. The number of Oba taken determines the number of shares one receives during sharing of items provided to ndi Oba.
Omume Oba includes examination tests and rituals to prepare and make the candidate worthy of the title before he is conferred with it. The traditional symbol of authority (ofo) is stamped on the recipient chest. Oba title involves a lot of entertainment as guests usually attend the celebration from other villages that make up Anam.

After 28 days of indoors, the celebrant is called seven times after which he will perform the oba rituals and blessed with the ofor. A day preceding the final day he is rubbed with uye and he dances the uvio music. Finally he performs the Ichi mmuo rituals and he is adorn with the red cap with eagle feathers and he picks a name for himself. He dances round the village with his wife.

Ichi Muo title-taking 
Ichi muo title taking involves a 12 hour ritual undergone by a candidate waiting to be conferred with Ogbuevi title after the completion of the initial formalities. The crucial aspect of the ceremony is usually performed at night and witnessed by title holders, family members and friends of the candidate. His wife is asked to leave the premises until the title has been conferred on the husband.

The candidate takes vows to not steal, commit adultery, lie, leak official secrets or conspire with others to do wrong things once he takes the title. In other to be free from his previous sins he goes into hiding known as Izo mmuo (hiding from the spirit of ancestors) in other to purge himself of his wrongdoings. He is made to be half naked and his body robbed with mud for hours until it is time to call him out in a ceremony known as Oku Oba ( a call for the candidate, purported to have been made by the ancestors). All these actions were believed to be enough penance for the candidate for his wrongdoings.

The solitary confinement enables the candidate to reflect on his past, repent, and resolve to make changes as from that date so as to be accepted by the ancestors. The mud was to show how dirty he was as a result of his sins. The candidate waits until he is called out for cleansing. The call is made seven times but the candidate will answer only once, after the last call. Failure to answer is an offence which could be prevent him from receiving the title (Idako n'oba) until another time.

After answering the seventh call the candidate emerges from his confinement and presents himself for the stamping of the ofo on his chest. He receives oche mgbo (three legged stool), an iron staff (Alo) and headgear (ege). The offering and receiving of items were done within nge Oba, a cane fence tied on four poles of 3 metres square. Only the titled men stay within the nge when the ritual is going on. Any uninitiated who enter the nge ekotego okwu ndi Oba and is imposed of a fine by ndi Oba.

At the end of the presentation the candidate takes his bath and prepares for the outing the next day. Entertainment is presented to his guests on this day.
The next day is the outing ceremony, during this day the New Ogbuevi in the company of the old ones adorn themselves with the expensive clothing called otachi and danced round in circle to the uvio music. The dance is known as Egwu ogbugbe. They blow elephant tusks (oke) and salute the others with their nza (horse tail). At this stage the friends, family members and well wishers appreciate them by spraying money. It is at this point that the celebrant is permitted to put on the red cap and ege appended with eagle feathers. The Ogbuevi wears beads, ona worn on his legs and a rope worn on the anklets to show that he is now a titled man. Before he is allowed to wear these Regalia's the Ogbuevi is made to pay a fine to atune to the number of times he may have worn red caps in the past before he became an Ogbuevi.

The Ogbuevi is also giving azizo oji (a wood carving) that he places on the wall at the entrance to his house. This azizo oji shows that the owner of the house is an Ogbuevi. The wall is also decorated with different colours ranging from blue, white red or yellow that painting is e signature of the Ogbuevi and the number of decoration tells us the number of Oba in that house.

Ogbuevi expectations 
Ogbuevi is not expected to eat cassava or garri. He is expected to eat pounded yam. Ogbuevi does not eat food prepared by a woman who is undergoing her menstrual cycle. Such women are not allowed to enter his obi; this was the reason why they marry more than one wife. He is not expected to lie or deliberately take sides in judgement. He is expected to be transparent in his actions and judgements. He is expected to be outspoken and straight forward. As custodian of culture, he ensures enforcement of the traditional laws and edicts.

Otu Okpukpu (Iyom)

Most prominent among women's social organizations in Umueze Anam is the Nde Okpukpu (Odu) Society. Members wear large ivory bangles on her hands and legs  at all times as a mark of nobility. After the initiation ceremony known as Isi Nli Okpukpu, the initiate is addressed as Iyom.

Government

The Governance of Umueze Anam Community rests on the shoulders of the council of elders (Irúkpo and Izummuo). The chairman of the council of elders is the Diokpala who is regarded as the paramount ruler of the town (Igwé).

The council of elders performs both judicial and legislative functions; they consist of men who are from the age of seventy years and above who have taken the oba and asammuo title and therefore cannot lie or mislead the community.

Next in the hierarchy are the Okpokolo (from 60 years to 70 years), who enforce the laws made by the Irúkpo and Izummuo; they determine the dates for the festivals of the community, and they are in charge of the masquerades and the cultural heritage of the community.
During time of war they are in charge of recruitment of able-bodied men and prepare them for war. They lead the able-bodied men to prosecute the war. They are in charge of the oba title; they determine the requirements for the Oba title ceremony, as well as who is qualified for the title.

Next after Okpokolo are the Owanuno (55 years to 60 years); they are the errand boys of the council of elders; they are responsible for sharing proceeds from ponds festivals, title taking and burials for the elders; they are in charge of the Owakwa masquerade. They are in charge of town crying and mobilization of the community for an important event.

The Otuasa group (50 years to 55 years) are in charge of the community lands, ponds and other economic ventures of the town; they collect rents and royalties for the community and remit same to the council of elders.

Isi-ikolobia (40 years to 45 years) are the soul of the community. Their job is to mobilize the youths for work when the need arises such as clearing of bush paths, stream paths, digging of graves, and other works. They are also in charge of security of the village under the supervision of the Izummuo, and during war lead the able-bodied men to prosecute war.

Mmeghe Ruling Age Grade are in charge of the town's developmental projects such as provision of basic infrastructure such as roads, school, and water.
With the exception of the Elders council (Irúkpo), every other group's tenure is four years.

Kingship in Umueze Anam was a product of colonization by the British Imperialists who imposed warrant chiefs on the community. The first king in Umueze Anam was Igwe John Eziolise of Ebendu who reigned from 1974 to 1978 after which Igwe John Emeka of Ezumezu took over and reigned from 1978 to 2003. Igwe John Ikebudu of Aneke reigned from 2004 to 2009 though his reign was riddled with crises.

Geographical divisions

Territorially, Umueze Anam is segmented into six in a cluster of mixed families: Odah, Isi-Araka, Ndi-Osita, Ama-órji, Ilò, and Isigom. For electoral purposes, there are two wards: Ward 1 (Ilo-Odah i.e. Agha and Aneke) and Ward 2 (Ilò-Isigom i.e. Ezumezu and Ebendu).

The main advantage of this unique arrangement is that it guarantees enduring good neighbourliness as social tensions in a cluster cannot easily be transported to another cluster (when vengeance is lurking) for fear of harming a relation in there. It is a known fact that the neighbouring community, Onitsha, surreptitiously copied this culture, but the glamour was not properly assimilated and diffused there.

Music
Anam people were lovers of music. In fact, there was almost no function in Anam without one type of music or another. Music featured prominently at festivities and events such as childbirth, marriage, title taking as well as funeral ceremonies.

From these, developed the huge business of the type of music that is known today all over Anam. The most popular musician in Umueze Anam is Sunday Mozie, a.k.a. 'Ugegbe Anam', a prolific (Egwu-Ekpili) recording artist and frequent live performer who skillfully blends Anam cultural rhythms with modern musical instrumentation.

Religion

Umueze Anam is predominantly traditional belief. They strongly believe in their Supreme Being called Chukwuobiama who sends guardian angels known as chukwuoke to each individual for protection. They commune with the saints known as the ancestors who intercede on their behalf to God. They believe in reincarnation, witchcraft, divination, and masquerading as the spirit of the dead.

To attract favour from God, each family establishes a family altar (Okposi) where sacrifices are made and libation is poured to the ancestors, chukwuoke and Chukwuobiama. The traditional belief system is similar to Christianity, hence the embracing of Catholicism when Europeans came.

Birth ceremony

On the birth of a child in Umueze Anam, the family ceases from any form of work and feasts for twelve days after which the child is circumcised if male. Also, offering is made to the Ijeoku, ancestors of the family responsible for the gift of a child. It is the duty of the diokpala in the family to name the child.

Marriage

Umueze Anam sees marriage as a happy life for couples to enjoy together. It is also for procreation, carrying out economic activities together and joint ownership of wealth and investments. In Anam, marriage is very important to the survival of families. Anam are predominantly farmers and therefore sees marriage as getting a helper that will assist in farming and raising up children. People will marry early and often have more than one wife. The marriage ceremony is in four stages.

Obanwa 
Obanwa could be done at the early stage. When a girl is born especially to a friendly family the father of the prospective suitor goes to the family of the girl and deposits five kobo (sisi) and the girl shall be deemed to have been betrothed to the young boy. Both of them grow up to see themselves as husband and wife. Obanwa symbolizes betrothal and is the first thing that is done after introduction. Presently five Naira, two cartons of beer, one schnapps and packets of cigarette is presented even though it varies from family to villages. The sisi is very symbolic in the marriage such that at the point of divorce it is this five Naira that is returned to the man irrespective of what is paid as bride price.

Oliyi 
Oliyi is what is presented ndi uno to tell the ancestors that their daughter has been married out. The requirements varies from kindred to kindred. Irrespective of where the marriage was contracted these requirements must be sent down home to the kindred and shall be kept at the eldest man of the kindred's Obi until such a time the elders share this at the general meeting. Once this is accepted the marriage has been endorsed by the ancestors.

Imego Nwunye 
The next is payment of bride price this is the prerogative of the father of the bride. After the payment of the bride price isikolobia, Umuada, inyemu ndi uno and umuagbo is settled the requirements vary from kindred to kindred. Itu oyi Nwa is when the bride price is paid the mother of the bride accompanied by her nwunyedis dances and makes a joyful noise to inform the neighborhood that the daughter has been given out in marriage.

Ndunege Nwunye 
Two young boys are asked to accompany the bride to the husband's home after sent forth is organized for the friends and well wishers. The parents of the bride provide items such as cooking utensils, clothing, and sewing machines. This will enable the bride to effectively manage her new home. These items are displayed on the eve of the sendforth.

For a lady married by an Anam man, Nnatanwunye rite is done. The age grade of the groom assembles to receive their new wife. It is usually a colorful event. The bride is expected to perform itu ava, and dance kengedege Igba timu obu. Gifts and cash is showered on the bride and groom. Entertainment is provided and at about 12 am the bride and the groom are escorted to their room to consummate their marriage while the age grade members continues with the merriment until dawn. The two young boys that saw the bride off to her grooms house comes back with aka ewu and some Olu oku (Goat upper limb and chicken laps).

Ivili Akwo 
Ivili akwo (moulden of clay stove), is usually performed when the new bride enters a man's house for the first time. The groom's family will find a virtuous woman married to a member of the groom's family who is adjudged to be of an exemplary wife, a role model to come and perform this task. This woman takes the new bride in and reveals to her the secret of marital success, tells her of the dos and donts of marriage as it affects the family. The bride is expected to see this woman as her role model and confidant. This akwo symbolizes the place of the bride in the family, every married woman in Anam must have an akwo hence the saying that our family is "Akwo ito" meaning that the family has three mothers married to one man.

When the woman dies another ritual is performed it is known as ire akwo (breaking of the akwo) this is performed by a daughter in law who related very well with the woman while alive and has found favor in her.

Inezi Ceremony 
The Inezi ceremony is a year-long ceremony which promotes industriousness, good cooking skills, and handiwork, which are considered good qualities for sustaining marriage. It is expected that young maidens who have these qualities attached to their beauty are attracted to their suitors who ask for their hands in marriage.

They use natural cosmetics like uye, nzu, and uli, to adorn their body with marks. They wear beads known as Olokpo on top of their nja which they wear on their waist. Their legs are adorned with anklets called akpulu-ulu. They usually wear wigs called I mbute. They wear dresses that reveal their pointed breasts which suggest they are virgins.

The last four days were marked with a lot of celebrations, parents came to town with plenty of foods and drinks to entertain family members, friends in-laws who came to celebrate with their daughters.

The isi ikolobia helps with fetching fire woods and pounding of yams and fufu.

During the opu ive ezi (outing rite), all the maidens assembled themselves at Ilo for beauty parade. They dance and demonstrate their beauty, especially to the eligible bachelors. Some participants do not take place in the outing rite, as they have married before the end of the year-long ceremony. Some such girls have mock ezi known as iti udu before marrying their husbands, and thus they were not required to come back and participate in the final ceremony.

The young maidens during the parade carry udu, which they beat as they parade with songs. This ceremony is known as ibi aka n'udu or iti udu. It is also believed that ibi aka n'udu is a symbol of virginity as those who are not virgins are not allowed to pass through that rite. While the already married maidens parade while carrying chewing stick in their mouth the free maidens and not betrothed don't carry chewing stick. Therefore, chewing stick is a symbol to show that she is not free for suitors.

After the ceremony the married maidens go back to their husbands while those yet to be married wait for their time. It is important to note that its only the wayward girls that never get married months after the ceremony and during the ada masquerade such girls are usually sang with ( Nma enwerodi na Nma ekilisi ada). This waiting period is very critical and tempting for parents and it is their onus to guide against their daughter having illicit affair so that they won't get pregnant during that period and therefore lose their chance of getting a better suitor. Girls with such misadventure are married off to old men who might probably be looking for children. This is a humiliation to both parents and family members.

It was also said that Inezi ceremony helps young men who were not thinking of marriage to start thinking in that direction.

Divorce 
In Anam, divorce is badly tolerated except for marital unfaithfulness and witchcraft allegation.

If a man decides to divorce the wife, such a person is expected to throw away the woman's cooking utensils such as pots, stove, etc. It will mean that the man has sworn not to marry again (inwu Iyi) and at this point the woman will no longer be permitted to go into the man's house and will be taken home by her people. At this point the woman lives in her father's house or rent a house (Obinkiti). The parents are expected to return the sisi to the husband's family but this is not done until she gets married again. The reason for this is because tradition does not allow a woman to bear children in her father's house. Such children do not bear the surname of their mother, our culture has it that all the children born by the woman while she was divorced belongs to the husband. This reason makes most men not to allow their wives to stay so long outside his home simply because they may not be able to tolerate children not fathered by them. This also contributes to the reason why divorce is not rampant in Anam too. In Umueze Anam, a woman married to an Umueze Anam man and divorced cannot be married by another Umueze Anam man, unless he has married to another person outside the town and divorced. This check also ensures that secret lovers do not instigate their lover to divorce their husbands and marry them. When the divorcée marries another man, the family of the former husband is notified and the sisi refunded back to them. This severed the ties the woman had with the man.

When a woman reconciles with the husband and returns to the man's house, she is not expected to enter the man's house unless a ritual is performed to exonerate her from the adulterous practices indulged in the past. This is usually done by Umuada.

Iwanya Oji N'iyi 
Iwanya Oji n'inyi is a ceremony for the cleansing of a woman who separated from her husband for some time and has returned to the husband. It is assumed that within the period of their separation, she must have had extramarital affairs, unlike a married woman. The community believes that food prepared by an adulterous wife may lead to her husband's death. Thus whether the wife leaves the matrimonial home on her own/is Isibe die gbapu/igbari die, or sent out of the house by the husband, through inwu iyi nwunye/just calling the nearest member of the village (onumbi) that its member must be called on notice while swearing in the name of a popular alusi/shrine that he will never marry that woman again. The estranged wife can never enter the house again without being cleansed through iwanya oji n'iyi.

The ceremony involves an elder using a kola nut to pronounce guilt and forgiveness on the woman at the same time, in the name of the appropriate alusi/shrine, before breaking the kola nut but for the couple to take. It is performed in the corridor in the presence of a few witnesses for the wife to reunite physically with the husband or in spirit if he has just died and the wife has come to perform the necessary rites/rituals. It is different from iti igba mgbaata for a former wife and children supposedly born in the second marriage, as may have been assumed earlier by a contributor.

Nkuchi 
Nkuchi nwanyi is a social phenomenon in which the family of a dead man meets with the man's wife after the final burial rites/iputa ito or iputa isaa and presents a male member of the family younger than the deceased to inherit the man's widow to avoid the woman remaining a widow forever with her children not having anybody to take care of them as a father. The new husband may be the woman's step son or her brother in law or any other member of the family deemed fit for the task. He may be younger or older than the widow, but he must be younger than the late husband. The widow is free to accept the person presented or reject him.

Should the remarriage take place, the woman becomes the bonafide wife of the man and any child she bears after nine months bears the new husband's name. A widow has the option to remain her husband's widow or to marry a man of her choice. Nkuchi was designed to ensure that widows do not dishonor the family and to ensure that children are not fathered by people of questionable character.

Some people have condemned the practice due to allegations of conspiracy to kill a man in order for both secret lovers to marry in the name of Nkuchi (though not witnessed in Anam) or that it forces a union of two incompatible persons, which could result in the man insisting on marrying a second wife (Nwunye Chi) which could lead to fighting in the family.

Funerals

Beliefs 
In Umueze Anam, death is seen as returning to the land of the ancestors. One could only journey to the land of the ancestors if he led a good life while on earth. He will be accepted by the ancestors and becomes the guardian and intercessor before God (Chukwu Obiama) for their people, but if the person led a bad life he is banished to abyss and will be crushed. For a deceased to have a smooth passage to the land of the ancestors, a befitting burial ceremony must be done. It is the belief that the deceased not properly buried will remain a wanderer and became an evil spirit tormenting people and manifesting in all forms.

Death of a child 
In Umueze Anam a child's death is a bad omen. It is either the child is an ogbanje or killed by witches and the child is buried that day without any ceremony or ritual. The child is not buried at home but in the bush so that such spirit will not reincarnate again to torment the parent. If the child buried is suspected to be an ogbanje, the corpse will be given a mark so that when he or she comes again he can easily be identified and treated with caution and disdain.

Death of a youth 
For the death of a youth who is not married it is said that na okpali avala, which means that the death is untimely. The entire community will be calm since it is a taboo to hear that a youth died. In some cases the age grade and family member will consult a diviner to know the cause of the death since according to the belief of the community such deaths is often caused by witches, oracle or evil deeds of either the parents, ancestors or the person in question. The notion is that if the death is not natural, anybody participating in such may incur the wrath of the gods. If the cause is not natural, the gods are appeased before the person can be buried and if it is caused by an oracle the corpse is either bailed from the oracle or returned to the oracle.

The age grade assembles to perform the burial (igba okwa), during which they act with rage and bitterness. They will break anything that is kept along their part. They will patrol with blue powder and will pour it on any youth that did not join them in the mourning. They will engage in wrestling (ITU nyajili).

Every member of the age grade and any other youth shall contribute a token called utu mmanya. This is necessary because the bereaved family is not expected to be burdened by the age grade. The family shall provide a goat known as ewu ikpo and this will be used for onya isi ceremony.

Onya isi ceremony is when the members of the age grade gather and people who are very friendly or known to the deceased shall come one after the other to eulogize the dead. They will testify on their encounter with the dead either as a friend or even a foe or that they entangled in a wrestling bout. Onya isi is usually a solemn affair and at the end the bereaved family will confer and decide who is closest to the dead, who will be given a knife to kill the goat. He will parade the town with the goat head to the admiration of the community. He is expected to provide one carton of beer for the burial of his friend (itu uni). The mourning period for youths and persons not up to the age of okpokolo is 12 days (Izu ito).

Death of a wife 
The burial of a woman married to an Anam man is fairly simple. The children or family members are expected to notify the family of the deceased woman (ndi ikwu nneve) through a ritual called igbaje icho. They present the family with a large metal pan or bowl, a paddle (eku), and a metal cup; this signifies the return of the woman's cooking utensils presented to her by her parents. The woman's family will then prepare to attend the burial of the woman with their masquerade, or kindred igba, and with items for itu uni. If the woman's paternal home is close, the corpse may be taken to their house for final visit before burial. Umuotu will be notified of the burial of their colleague and they will come and perform the oni ozu and ire akwo. Umuada will also come and perform their own oni ozu while the inyemu ndi uno will perform the ritual of ire akwo. A family that is able will use a cow to perform the ire akwo and oni ozu, but for those not able, ogu Akpa ego into (4000) will be paid to represent the cow.

Ire akwo 
The Ire akwo ceremony is performed by one of the daughters in-law of the woman who took care of the woman very well. This ceremony is usually done on the twelfth day of the burial (Izu ito). There is also a ceremony called Ike omaba for the deceased. This is usually done for those that took the iyom title (ive okpu). One of the daughters or daughters in-law of the deceased will tie wrapper with special knotches and with an appe (hand fan) dances round the village with her fellow woman singing songs that eulogize the deceased while sympathizers give them money.

Other deaths 
For any other person who is neither an Oba title holder nor among Okpokolo age grade, there is not much attachment to their burial. Their burial activities end after Izu ito. For an Oba title holder who has performed the ichi Muo ceremony and has attained the age of okpokolo the burial extends up to 28 days.

When an elderly man who is an Oba title holder dies, the first thing that is done is the idapu ozu, this includes what is called ote kpim kpim. The family of the deceased is expected to go house to house of his fellow elders and Oba title holders to notify them that the Ogbuevi has joined his ancestors and he is about to be laid in state. The Oba title holders come to inspect the corpse to see if he is properly kept and dressed in his regalia. After this the ukolo is brought and played to notify the entire village that a great man has joined his ancestors. The next is itupu okwa izizi (oso nkodo nkodo). The immediate family members are expected to adorn themselves with the regalia of the deceased such as otachi, okpu Mme, ooke, nza, etc. while the ada carries the ubom that is beaten by her. Such men are usually buried in the night, except for Christians whose corpse will be taken to the church to be prayed for.

Burial in Anam is usually done in the night, and the ceremony continues in the evening with the age grades of the children and other extended family members supporting their bereaved colleagues with their music. Burials occur at night because most of the community are farmers who work during the day and gather during the night for leisure activities. The bereaved family members entertain his age grade with drinks and food. A fowl, called Okuku nlavochi, is killed in the early morning around 5 am and subsequently with ewu okwa the next evening. If he invites the entire Anam Mkpu isa he will kill seven fowl as oku nlavo chi and one cow as Ewu okwa. Recently people no longer use Okuku for nlavo chi but ewu. The age grade musicians entertain the age grade throughout the night after the ito onu token is presented. The members of the age grade contribute tokens to the bereaved as a means of cushioning his expenses. These contributions depend on how popular the person is and also if he does same for people as the list of benefactors are recorded.

The next day, the in-laws, well wishers and friends come for itu uni. They will come with a piece of cloth, drinks, goat, cow and money depending on the person's capabilities. Some in-laws will come with dance groups or even masquerade. Ndi Nna Oche will come with their music and masquerade and when they are going they will be given a goat, ram or cow depending on relationships and capability of the bereaved family. This will continue until the next morning when ewu nsekute will be killed to mark the end of the first burial. The funeral room and the bed is left with the clothes, regalias and other precious ornaments of the deceased kept daily until after izu ito or izu isa as the case may be. For a woman who is an item, her Ookpu (ivory) is displayed and for titled man, his Ooke (elephant tusk) is kept and it is blown by the eldest son.

During the lying in state of the deceased, the wife or wives will be paraded to cry for the deceased that night. They will be eulogizing the deceased as they sit beside the corpse fanning it with a hand fan until it is buried. The same is done by the husband if the deceased is a woman. After the corpse is buried, the spouses are made to sit on a mat in the funeral room everyday until izu ito and izu isa is completed. During that period while the deceased is laid in state, the wife puts on her best clothes and ornaments as it was when they wedded. The next day the spouse puts on nkilika okala (rag) and he or she is not expected to talk to anyone. Their only duty is to come out before anybody wakes to cry in the morning. After that he or she is given water to wash their face and go inside. This is so because it is believed that the deceased spirit has not sojourned to the land of ancestors. This continues until after Izu ito for deceased woman or a man who has not attained the age of okpokolo and Izu is a for titled elderly man. After this, the isa oni ozu ritual will be performed to send the ancestors to the land of the dead before the wife will then start wearing agbo (white cloth). She can start talking to people but will not go out until after six months, when she then begins wearing black clothing; she will mourn for another year. The period of mourning in Anam before was 18months until recently it was reduced to six months and the wearing of black removed. During the period of her wearing black, she is free to move about and talk to people but cannot see any man.

After the burial ceremony, every morning and evening the first daughter (Ada) is expected to dress in her father's chieftaincy regalia and with ubom, which she will beat round the town eulogizing the father and notifying the village of the death of the father until a day before Izu ito and Izu isa as the case may be. When she gets to the frontage of any elder, she while greet the person in the name of the late father and if she does it well people will be giving her money (ego ubom). She represents her late father every time she does that and on returning she will place the ubom in front of their house and puts the regalia and red cap on the ubom. That ubom standing outside represents the late father who is still believed to be hovering round the house.

For a titled man during the izu ito, the first son shall be painted with uye wearing Ogoro and red cap with feather and oche mgbo on his armpit. He will be going round the titled men's house, greeting them and they in return gives him money and drinks. This rite is called ite uye. After that, during the izu isa, the kindred parades the town with their communal drum while the children dressed on their fathers regalia danced as they parade. This rite is called ipu ive isa. It is after this rite that the funeral room is dismantled. It is the custom of the land that the eldest son and daughter stay at home throughout the mourning period without going anywhere while the others are expected to provide them with all the support and feeding they needed. If they cannot as a result of their work, somebody will volunteer to stay on their behalf while they are expected to pay a fine and provide the person staying with the drinks and food needed to carry him and the strangers that will be coming throughout that period.
Another rite of importance is the Ooni ozu, as an Ogbuevi, the children is expected to present to ndi Oba a live cow that will be shared by them and some money for snuff. If the family could not afford a cow, they will pay Ogwu akpego (4000) in place of the cow.

Ikwabi Ozu 
The next is ikwabi ozu rite, this rite is done so that the spirit of the deceased can sojourn to the land of the ancestors. The age grade of the deceased gathers, with the closest family relative of the deceased among the age grade being in charge of the ceremony. An okposi is provided, the first rite is the olokpu azu, smoked sizeable fishes are provided with red oil and salt, this will be used to invoke the spirit of the dead on the okposi, the remainder of the fish is used to prepare very thick ogbono soup that is shared among all present. After this one Ikenga ewu is killed and the blood spilled over the okposi and it is used to prepare nsala soup, after invocation and appeasing of the spirit of the deceased to setforth his journey and join the good ancestors to intercede for them, the okposi is pushed outside with leg by the Celebrant (igbapu okposi n'lo), which means that he has accepted the sacrifice and has departed. This rite releases the wife of the man from the deceased so that she can start communication with others except for sexual intercourse.

Mourning Period 
The spouse of the bereaved is expected not to shave or comb her hair until the period of mourning is over this is a sign to any man who makes advances to steer clear of the woman. After the period of mourning, she is expected to shave her hair and burn her mourning cloths.

When mourning is over the children of the deceased share the belongings of their father including the pieces of clothes brought during itu uni. Also during that time they decide on who will kuchie the woman hence the popular saying that "nwanyi si ana akpa nkata aru eji ke ive diee si tinye kwe maka onye ya ekuchi ya" It is supposed to be the responsibility of the uncle to kuchie the deceased wife or the first born son if the woman is her step mother.

The burial rite for the eldest man in the community (Diokpala) is similar to that of the titled men but the slight difference is that when the diokpala dies, the corpse is hidden for three native years (about 2 years) the burial is the responsibility of the entire community. All the age grade will have their stand, bring their music and prepare their dishes. The first thing in the morning of the burial is the ada masquerade performance, the night will be the akpali masquerade by 12 am and subsequently the odumodu masquerade. After the burial and mourning of the deceased, the next to the eldest man will perform the ikpoche eziobi rite so that he can ascend the throne. Odumodu masquerade performs for elders who are members of irukpo age grade as well.

Umueze Anam Festivals and Celebrations
Umueze Anam has two major festivals that are celebrated annually and they are Nzire Ani and Otite Anam festivals.

Nzire Ani 
Nzire Ani or Nzide Ani festival is a festival celebrated by Anam people. The name Nzire Ani means the coming down of Ani Anam deity from on top of Nkpu (Anthill) where it is kept during the flooding season. It marks the beginning of a new native year.

Ani Anam is best regarded as a covenant rather than an Oracle. During the early settlement of Anam people, there was a lot of crime such as adultery, killing of a fellow Anamite, stealing, covetousness, betrayal etc. This resulted from the heterogeneity of Anam communities so the elders decided to have a bond that will bind all together and promote security and mutual trust. On that fateful day the elders gathered at Odah and made a covenant, that no Anamite shall kill a fellow Anamite, No Anamite shall covet another's property or wife, no Anamite shall betray his brother, no Anamite shall bear false witness against the other. This is why the invocation of the deity starts with Ani Anam akodi onye eme ive ma ive emie. What it means is that the convenient goes after the guilty and not the just.

Anam, being a flood prone area is usually being submerged in water during the rainy season. This flood destroys their houses, crops, livestock and sometimes kills their children. During this season, children and valuable artifacts are kept on the nkpu and okpulukpu (platforms) built in the house above water level. The people during this period prays to their ancestors for protection and safe keeping. The Ani Anam deity is also kept on this platform as well. When the flood receded, the chief priest announces a date for the Ani deity to return to its abode and it is marked with pomp and pageantry, the people gives offering of Thanksgiving to their chi for protecting them from destruction.

Another aspect of the festival is the marking of the victory over the Adah and Aboh warriors.

The third aspect of this festival is the dedication of the new year and the new planting season to God and the ancestors. This festival is used by the elders to appease the gods for a bountiful harvest in the new planting season. It is after this festival that farmers go back to their farms to cultivate. This festival was usually being celebrated in October but it was moved to the last Eke day before Christmas Day to accommodate people who may be coming home during the Christmas holiday and to ensure wider participation.

The celebration of this festival starts a month to the actual date of the celebration with the Otiekwe Adah, a masquerade that moves round the village with a wooden gong announcing to the people that the festival is at hand. This is symbolic because it signifies the way the warriors that defeated Adah people were mobilized. The Otiekwe Adah moves round the villages every night while chanting. The eve of the Nzire Ani is usually eventful, it is the last day of Otiekwe masquerade performance and the dreadful Akpali masquerade. Akpali masquerade is the spirit that controls the water current (turbulence). When this masquerade performs at night and in the morning, boats are docked ashore even at the village square, earthen pots kept carelessly are broken by this wave. The Akpali masquerade abhors light and breaks every light placed on their path. It is only the initiates that come out at night to be a part of the masquerade procession while Izummuo (Otummuo) age grade regulates their activities .

The Nzire Ani day is a very eventful day. It starts at dawn with the procession of Adah masquerade. The Adah masquerade is led by odogwu Ada that goes with Oji and is led by Okpokolo age grade. The procession terminates at Odah bank of the Onwambala river where the masquerade pelts stones into the river to signify the defeat of the Adah people. After this is done, the next is the mobilization of the youths for ijo Nzire Ani. This Ijo is used to mock those who may have engaged in any immoral and evil acts. This is done to discourage people from carrying out evil plots.

After the Ijo Nzire Ani, the elders converge at the eldest man's house to join him as he pours libations to the ancestors and prays for God's blessings, favour and protection on our people and for fruitful planting season. Otimkpala masquerade appears at this point with a whip and symbolically whips the eldest man on his leg, this gives the otimkpala masquerades the powers to whip everybody that comes their way. The Otimkpala masquerades perform side by side with the libations and offer of Thanksgiving to their gods by the elders. At about 4 pm, the strong and brave youths appear at the village square with canes to wrestle with the spirits (okpa ege). The masquerades with their cane whip the men while the men dodge with their own stick and when a masquerade is thrown down, it goes out of the scene, same with the men. The last man standing wins the contest in Umueze Anam.

While the wrestling is going on, the Owakwa masquerade gets ready to perform. The Owakwa masquerade comes out with bravery and supernatural powers. The masquerade goes about with a live fowl tied on the head at the back. The opotiyi masquerade is expected to appear and cut off this fowl but the Owakwa will not allow it so both of them will engage in hide and seek game. While the opotiyi marshals out its plan to take the fowl, the Owakwa will be pursuing it with a big stick. If the opotiyi fails to cut off the fowl, the Owakwa goes with it, but if he succeeds the opotiyi goes with it. At the sunset when the Owakwa finishes his performance, the about of eneooo takes over the airwaves and at this point the women and children go to bed because the greatest of the masquerade (Odumodu) is getting ready to come out. At this point it is the time for ochiagba Odumodu and I enjoy this part a lot it is only the initiates that come out at this point. The Odumodu has so many powers and manipulations, one of this is that it duplicates itself such that one can be at one end of the town and the other at the other end. It has ibobo such that you cannot run faster than the masquerade. This masquerade remains powerless until it pays homage to the Ani Anam deity and the eldest man it is when it goes to the bearer of Ani Anam that he takes the cane and his powers restored to him. This masquerade performs all night long and in at dawn it goes home walking like a boneless wanderer.

Otite Mbah 
In Umueze Anam Otite Mba is celebrated a month before Otite Anam. Some school of thought said that one Mba Nwinya who was a renowned farmer and harvests yam quite early ahead of others and for this reason will celebrate his otite to enable him eat the fruit of his labour as at then it is not honorable to eat yam if otite has not been celebrated. This is practice later was popularized and celebrated in Umueze Anam the Mba family holds this tradition until date.

Age grade system
Umueze Anam practices Republican method of governance in which power is devolved to age grades. Each age grades consists of people within three years age bracket.

Ikpoko Ogbo 
At the age of fourteen, all young males within this age bracket (3 years) come together in groups to form the age grade system. During this period maturity is tested through wrestling and anybody defeated will not join the group.

Ibanamanwu
After four years of Ikpoko ogbo, the age group at 18 years is initiated into the masquerade system. On the day of initiation during the Nzire Ani festival, the courage and endurance of the group is tested through whipping by anyanchu cain on their legs. They are exposed to the egwegeregwe awala masquerade which dances at the village square kindred by kindred.

Igbajisi

At the age of forty, all male adults of this age grade are initiated into adulthood through this ceremony. Prior to this ceremony it is expected that all of them must have married and the first to marry is celebrated as the father of the age grade (Nna Iru). After this celebration they are cleansed through shaving of their youthful hairs before taking up Isikolobia. As Isikolobia they are responsible for the organization and supervision of the youths to undertake specific jobs assigned to the youths such as vigilante services, clearing of village square, pathways, streams, fetching of firewood, digging of graves etc.

Otu asa 
After the headship of Isikolobia, the age grade graduates to Otu asa, outasa is responsible for collection of royalties and rents accruing from ponds, lakes, rivers, land and farm settlements and submit the accruals to Izumuo.

Alagbo 
These are age grades that has no responsibility, it is a period of rest before taking up higher responsibilities.

Mmeghe 
This is the age grade that oversees the development activities of the town. They are responsible for imposition of developmental levies.

Owanuno 
This is the age grade that enforces fines and penalties and are in charge of the mobilization of the youths in times of war.

Okpokolo 
They are in charge of title taking, festivals and enforcement of punishment for masquerade offenders.

Izumuo 
They in conjunction with irukpo governs and legislate over the affairs of the community. They enforce laws, mobilizes the youths and collect all fines and punishments as determined by the elders council.

Irukpo 
They are the paramount rulers of the town, they legislate and adjudicate over the affairs of the community. They hold the judicial powers and their decision is final. The chairman of this group is the Diokpala who is the paramount ruler of the town.

References 

 Anam People's Website
 Joe Ameke, Anam 17th–20th Century, 1998

Populated places in Anambra State
Communities in Igboland